Tinu Anand (born Virender Raj Anand, 12 October 1945) is an Indian actor, director, writer and producer in Hindi cinema and a few Telugu and Tamil films.

Early life
He is the son of veteran writer Inder Raj Anand, brother of producer Bittu Anand and uncle of director Siddharth Anand. He did his schooling from Mayo College in India. He is Married to Shahnaz, daughter of veteran actor Agha (actor).

Career
His father, Inder Raj Anand, was a well-known writer in the film industry, but he did not want Tinnu, or his younger brother Bittu, to enter this industry. Inder Raj Anand would say that it was not the place for them. In the words of Tinnu Anand: "..when I told him I wanted to direct films, he was very upset. Ultimately, though, he saw that I didn't want to do anything else. So he sent me to the best school - the Satyajit Ray School. Mr. Ray and my father were friends, so my father asked him to take me under his wing."

Tinnu had been given a role in K. Abbas' film Saat Hindustani when..
"In the evening, I was given the dirty job of offering Amitabh Rs.5000 for the entire film, whether it took a year or five.. Amitabh reluctantly agreed as he was desperate to act. He got the role of the poet's friend in Saat Hindustani. When my father got the letter from Satyajit Ray saying I could work with him, I had to give up Saat Hindustani. So I left for Calcutta and Amitabh got the role of the poet that I was supposed to play.

(on working with actors who consistently show up quite late and put in only a few hours) "I give all the credit to Veeru (Devgan) who taught me how to unlearn what I had learnt. He told me that if you have to survive in this industry with actors like these, you should learn how to shoot a film when the actor's not there!" and: "I felt very proud when I showed Amitabh a scene between him and Amjad Khan in a dubbing studio one day. He was shocked and said 'But I never shot with Amjad'".

Anand also worked as an assistant director to Satyajit Ray for five years, in Bengali films, Goopy Gyne Bagha Byne (1969), Aranyer Din Ratri (1970), Pratidwandi (1970), Seemabaddha (1971) to Ashani Sanket (1973).

Anand portrayed an important role in Ghajini in 2008. In an interview, Tinu Anand spoke about his early days and also praised Amitabh Bachchan for his generosity.

Filmography

As actor

References

External links

 
 

Indian male film actors
Male actors in Hindi cinema
Hindi-language film directors
Film directors from Mumbai
Living people
Punjabi people
Punjabi Hindus
Mayo College alumni
20th-century Indian male actors
Indian male television actors
21st-century Indian male actors
20th-century Indian film directors
21st-century Indian film directors
1953 births